Michal Valenta (born 8 June 1977) is a Czech football player who currently plays for Ústí nad Labem.

References

External links
 

1977 births
Living people
Czech footballers
Czech First League players
Bohemians 1905 players
FK Ústí nad Labem players
FK Teplice players
Association football defenders